This article aims to compile various depictions of Thrissur in popular culture.

Films

 Thoovanathumbikal: Malayalam director Padmarajan's film Thoovanathumbikal was shot in Thrissur city. Almost all the main characters speak with a Thrissur accent for Malayalam. The character played by the lead actor Mohanlal was based on a citizen of Thrissur, Mannarthodi jayakrishnan, and his friends like Vijayan Karot.

 Pranchiyettan and The Saint: Malayalam director Ranjith's film Pranchiyettan and The Saint is based on Thrissur's Rice Bazaar. Malayalam actor Mammootty plays the lead role of a Thrissur-based rice vendor merchant, Francis aka Ari Pranchi.
 Punyalan Agarbattis: Directed by Ranjith Sankar, Punyalan Agarbattis tell the story of a young entrepreneur from Thrissur city, Joy Thakkolkaran which is played by Jayasurya.

 Sapthamashree Thaskaraha: Shot in the prime backdrop of Thrissur city, this satire film is directed by Anil Radhakrishnan Menon and tells the story of seven thief’s.

 Mathai Kuzhappakkaranalla: Jayasurya's character from Thrissur does a role of an innocent auto driver who unnecessarily interferes into the problems of others with a good intention of solving them.

 Punyalan Private Limited a sequence of movie Punyalan Agarbattis directed by Ranjith Sankar released in 2017.

 Diwanjimoola Grand Prix was the film shot in different locations in and around Thrissur town released in 2018.

Novels
 Malayalam writer Sarah Joseph's works are generally set in the background of city of Thrissur and nearby areas.

References

Culture of Thrissur
Indian cities in popular culture